This is a list of equipment of the Islamic Republic of Iran Air Defense Force.

Air defense artillery systems

Air defense missile systems

Man-portable air-defense systems

See also

 Iranian military industry
 List of military equipment manufactured in Iran
 List of aircraft of the Iranian Air Force
 List of aircraft of the Aerospace Force of the Islamic Revolutionary Guard Corps
 List of current ships of the Islamic Republic of Iran Navy
 List of equipment of the Navy of the Islamic Revolutionary Guard Corps
 List of equipment of the Iranian Army
 Tanks of Iran

References

Iranian military-related lists